The 2017–18 Dandenong Rangers season is the 26th season for the franchise in the Women's National Basketball League (WNBL).

Roster

Standings

Results

Pre-season

Regular season

Signings

Returning

Incoming

Awards

In-season

References

External links
Dandenong Rangers Official website

2017–18 WNBL season
WNBL seasons by team
2017–18 in Australian basketball
Basketball,Dandenong Rangers
Basketball,Dandenong Rangers